Richard Ackon (born 10 October 1978) is a retired Ghanaian footballer. He played as a midfielder.

He played for Ebusua Dwarfs in Ghana before joining Stabæk in Norway in 1997. He played for Stabæk in the Norwegian Premier League and the victorious 1998 Norwegian Football Cup run. He was also capped for Ghana, and was a squad member in the 1998 Africa Cup of Nations.

His last season at Stabæk was in 2001, he then returned to the Ebusua Dwarfs and played there until 2005.

References

1978 births
Living people
Ghanaian footballers
Ebusua Dwarfs players
Stabæk Fotball players
Eliteserien players
Expatriate footballers in Norway
Ghanaian expatriate footballers
Ghanaian expatriate sportspeople in Norway
Ghana international footballers
Ghana under-20 international footballers
1998 African Cup of Nations players
Association football midfielders